Federico Javier Santander Mereles (born 4 June 1991) is a Paraguayan professional footballer who plays as a forward for Guaraní on loan from the Italian  club Reggina, and the Paraguay national team.

Club career

Early career
Santander started in the youth divisions of Guaraní where he excelled and was part of the under-20 squad that won the international friendly championship held in Valencia, Spain. After winning the U20 tournament with Guaraní he attracted the interest of several clubs and had a trial with A.C. Milan. In 2008, at the age of 16, he made his debut with the senior squad of Guaraní by scoring a goal in the 5–2 win against Tacuary. On 31 August 2010, he signed for French side Toulouse.

Argentina: Racing and Tigre
In February 2012, he moved to Racing Club on a three-year contract with a purchase option for 20% of his sports rights.

In July 2012, Santander joined Argentine Primera División side Tigre on a one-year loan deal despite that Guaraní had intentions to bring him back to Paraguay. He was handed the number #24 shirt for the 2012–13 season and debuted in a 2–1 home defeat against Estudiantes de La Plata on 6 August 2012.

Copenhagen
On 14 June 2015, Santander signed a five-year contract with the Danish Superliga team F.C. Copenhagen. He joined the club after completing Copa Libertadores with Guaraní. He made his league debut on 2 August 2015 against SønderjyskE making two assist, assisting Thomas Delaney and William Kvist. Three days later, he scored his first goal in a 3–2 defeat against FK Jablonec as Copenhagen failed to qualify for the UEFA Europa League group stage. On 16 May 2016, he netted twice to give his club a 2–0 win against FC Nordsjælland which crowned Copenhagen league champions. In his first season in Copenhagen he became the third highest goalscorer with 14 goals and four assists.

On 24 August 2016, Santander's goal in Copenhagen's qualification match versus Cypriot club APOEL secured his club's position in the 2016–17 Champions League.

Bologna
In June 2018 Santander signed a four-year contract with Italian club Bologna in a deal worth €6 million.

Reggina
On 2 August 2022, Santander moved to Reggina on a multi-year contract.

Return to Guaraní
On 27 January 2023, Santander returned to Guaraní on loan until 30 June 2023.

International career
On 28 September 2009, at the 2009 FIFA U-20 World Cup in Egypt, Santander scored the first goal for the Paraguay U-20 squad against home team Egypt, giving the Paraguayans a 1–0 lead.

Wearing the number 9 as a replacement for Roque Santa Cruz, he debuted for Paraguay on 9 October 2010 in a 1–0 loss against Australia in Sydney.

Career statistics

Club

International
Scores and results list Paraguay's goal tally first, score column indicates score after each Santander goal.

Honours
Copenhagen
 Danish Superliga: 2015–16, 2016–17
 Danish Cup: 2015–16, 2016–17

References

External links
 
 

1991 births
Living people
People from San Lorenzo, Paraguay
Paraguayan footballers
Association football forwards
Paraguay international footballers
Paraguay under-20 international footballers
2019 Copa América players
Paraguayan Primera División players
Ligue 1 players
Argentine Primera División players
Danish Superliga players
Serie A players
Serie B players
Club Guaraní players
Toulouse FC players
Racing Club de Avellaneda footballers
Club Atlético Tigre footballers
F.C. Copenhagen players
Bologna F.C. 1909 players
Reggina 1914 players
Paraguayan expatriate footballers
Paraguayan expatriate sportspeople in France
Expatriate footballers in France
Paraguayan expatriate sportspeople in Argentina
Expatriate footballers in Argentina
Paraguayan expatriate sportspeople in Denmark
Expatriate men's footballers in Denmark
Paraguayan expatriate sportspeople in Italy
Expatriate footballers in Italy